5th Battalion, 10th Marines (5/10) was a US artillery battalion.

5/10 may also refer to:
May 10 (month-day date notation)
October 5 (day-month date notation)
5 shillings and 10 pence in UK predecimal currency

See also
10/5 (disambiguation)
510, a year